Unione Sportiva Fiorenzuola 1922 Società Sportiva is an Italian association football club from Fiorenzuola d'Arda, Piacenza, Emilia-Romagna.

History
In its history, Fiorenzuola mostly played in amateur and lower professional leagues, except for a brief stint in the 1990s when the club reached Serie C1 and narrowly missed promotion to Serie B, after losing the 1995 promotion playoff final to Pistoiese on penalty shoot-outs. Also in 1995, Fiorenzuola made a great exploit in the Coppa Italia, being defeated 2–1 at home by Inter after having previously eliminated Brescia and Torino. In the following years Fiorenzuola started a slow decline which brought the club down to the Eccellenza. It currently plays in Serie C.

Colors and badge
The team's colors are red and black.

Stadium
Fiorenzuola play their home matches at the Stadio Comunale, also known as Velodrome Attilio Pavesi.

Current squad

Out on loan

Notable former managers
 Alberto Cavasin
 Massimo Ficcadenti
 Stefano Pioli

Honours
Eccellenza Emilia-Romagna
Winners: 2007–2008, 2013–2014 (Group A)

References

External links
 

 
Football clubs in Italy
Football clubs in Emilia-Romagna
Association football clubs established in 1922
Serie C clubs
1922 establishments in Italy